Marin Čilić was the defending champion but chose not to compete.
Martin Kližan won his first ATP World Tour title by defeating Fabio Fognini in the final, 6–2, 6–3.

Seeds

Draw

Finals

Top half

Bottom half

Qualifying

Seeds

Qualifiers

Lucky loser
  Ivan Nedelko

Draw

First qualifier

Second qualifier

Third qualifier

Fourth qualifier

References
 Main Draw
 Qualifying Draw

2012 Singles
St. Petersburg Open - Singles
2012 in Russian tennis